Bluebird (Harper Row) is a fictional character appearing in American comic books published by DC Comics. She is a supporting character of Batman. Harper Row was created by writer Scott Snyder and artist Greg Capullo, first appearing in Batman (vol. 2) #7 (March 2012), before debuting as Bluebird in Batman #28 (February 2014). Harper Row's Bluebird identity was designed by artist Dustin Nguyen. Within the fictional DC Universe, Harper Row officially joins Batman's group of allies during the events of Batman Eternal, a year-long weekly maxiseries.

Instead of taking on the mantle of Robin, which is traditionally that of Batman's sidekick, Harper Row instead adopts an entirely new superhero identity, Bluebird. Her appearance marks the arrival of the first new "Bat-family" character in Batman comics since DC relaunched its entire line in 2011 as part of its The New 52 publishing event.

Fallon Smythe portrays Harper Row in Gotham Knights.

Publication history
Harper Row first appeared as an unnamed cameo in Batman (vol. 2) #1 (September 2011). She later made her first full appearance in Batman (vol. 2) #7 (March 2012), where it is noted that she and Batman have met before. Their previous encounter was detailed in Batman #12 (Oct. 2012), illustrated by Becky Cloonan; this issue marked the first time a female artist has worked on the Batman title. Harper Row next appeared in Detective Comics (vol. 2) #21 (August 2013), the first time a writer other than Snyder has written her.

In Batman (vol. 2) #28 (April 2014), a sneak peek into the future of Batman Eternal, Harper Row makes her debut as Batman's new sidekick Bluebird.

Scott Snyder reportedly based Bluebird on a design created by the daughter of prominent cosplayer Kyrax2. "Harper & Row" was also the name of the major American publishing firm Harper from 1962 to 1990.

Fictional character biography
In early issues featuring Harper Row, she is introduced as a streetwise young woman from the Narrows, one of the roughest neighborhoods in Batman's locale of Gotham City. She and her brother Cullen Row are also revealed to be from a broken family with a deceased mother and a deadbeat father who would later end up in jail. With such humble beginnings, Row did not seem naturally inclined to be a hero. In fact, she made her first appearance stealing food from a Wayne charity gala. However, her life changed when she saved her brother Cullen from being gay-bashed. After the bullies managed to butcher Cullen's hair with a pair of scissors and Harper used a taser on one of them, they were saved by Batman who defeated the bullies and frightened the remaining one off. Batman's intervention left a lasting impression on the young woman. In addition to shaving her own head in solidarity with her brother, Harper began trying to learn more about Batman to assist him in his fight against crime in Gotham. She even managed to discover the devices Batman uses to disable the city's security cameras, and improved them with technology of her own design.

Her efforts only earned the Batman's ire; at one point he rewarded Harper's attempts at helping him by breaking her nose. The next day Harper visits Bruce Wayne at Wayne Tower and shows him plans that she thinks will help Batman. To her surprise, Bruce agrees. That night, Batman tracks Harper and apologizes to her. She tells him she may not know the details, but she knows he's going through a lot of pain (the death of Damian Wayne). She also reminds Batman what he means to the city with a touching and personal story. The issue concludes with Harper's message to Batman broadcast on Wayne Tower. It's one simple word taught to Harper by her mother before her death: "RESOLVE", which just so happens to begin with the letter "R".  Even saving Batman's life by pulling his unconscious body out of Gotham Bay and restarting his heart using only jumper cables and a car battery failed to win him over.

In Batman Eternal, Harper stows away on board Tim Drake's plane and, over the course of the series, gains his trust. In issue #41, she suits up as Bluebird for the first time to rescue her brother Cullen; Red Robin and his allies Batgirl and Red Hood are caught up in a trap, leaving it up to her. Despite setbacks in her relationship with Batman himself, a near-future flash forward shows that Row eventually manages to overcome Batman's reservations and joins him in fighting crime as Bluebird.

During Batman & Robin Eternal, Harper's mother was murdered by Cassandra Cain, who is eventually revealed to be acting as an agent of 'Mother', a villain who manipulates traumatised children on the grounds that she will make them stronger through trauma (although Cassandra had been sent to kill both of Harper's parents and only killed her mother before she found she couldn't do it). Mother had Harper's mother murdered as part of a plan to 'offer' Harper to Batman as the perfect Robin; Batman had made contact with her to try and expose her long-term agenda and believed that he was meant to kill the parents of the new Robin Mother had chosen for him, when actually he was just sent after two of Mother's other disciples as a test of his loyalty to her ideals while Harper's parents were attacked in Gotham. Despite recognising Harper's qualities would make her an ideal partner, at the time Batman simply forced her surviving father to take responsibility for his role as a parent as he didn't want to benefit from Mother's plan, never revealing the truth even after Harper began working with him as Bluebird. Mother attempts to win Harper to her point of view by arguing that her own family fell apart so that she had to rise up on her own, offering to let Harper kill Cassandra Cain after revealing that Cassandra was the one who killed her mother, but Harper rejects that idea, proclaiming that she grew up because her mother supported and recognised her desire for a better life rather than trying to make Harper be what her mother believed would work. Following Mother's defeat, Harper assures the returned Batman that she understands his reasons for not telling her about his history with Mother and his indirect role in her mother's death, but recent events have prompted her to go to college to receive official qualifications for her electrician skills and explore a life outside of the vigilante role, although Batman assures her as she leaves that Bluebird will always be welcome in Gotham if she decides to suit up again.

In 2016, DC Comics implemented another relaunch of its books called "DC Rebirth", which restored its continuity to a form much as it was prior to "The New 52". Harper is a supporting character in James Tynion's run on Detective Comics, where she works as a medical volunteer at Leslie Thompkins' clinic, and is a friend of Cain (Orphan) and Brown (Spoiler). She also accompanies Batwoman, Spoiler, Orphan and Batwing (Luke Fox) to investigate the Victim Syndicate.

During the "Joker War" storyline, Harper takes on the mantle of Bluebird once again as Joker's new sidekick Punchline's influence starts affecting Gotham's youngsters, including her brother Cullen.

Alternate versions

DC Bombshells
In an alternate history version of World War II, Harper Row is a teenage auto mechanic who works at a garage with Kathy Duquesne and Nell Little. She is shown to be a massive fan of Batwoman. During Batwoman's absence in Gotham, Harper along with Kathy and Nell form a team of Batgirls to protect the city. The Batgirls, joined by Alysia Yeoh and Bette Kane get into the Pinkey Orphanage to save Harper's brother, Cullen, and the rest of the orphans, who have been used to work on robots for the devious plans of Headmistress Webb. They later welcome Tim Drake, Cullen Row and Felicity Smoak into the team, and create a Bat family.

In other media

Television
 A teenage incarnation of Harper Row appears in Young Justice, voiced by Zehra Fazal. Introduced in the third season, this version is a rebellious, teenage loner and classmate of Halo and Forager's who regularly suffers abuse from her alcoholic father alongside her brother Cullen until Miss Martian eventually takes the Rows to child protective services. As of the fourth season, the Rows were adopted by Snapper and Bethany Lee Carr. Harper and Violet later become a couple in the fourth season finale.
 Harper Row appears in Gotham Knights, portrayed by Fallon Smythe. This version is a friend of Duela.

Video games
Harper Row / Bluebird was originally set to appear as a playable character in Injustice 2, but was cut for unknown reasons.

References

Characters created by Greg Capullo
Comics characters introduced in 2012
Comics characters introduced in 2014
DC Comics martial artists
DC Comics superheroes
DC Comics female superheroes
Fictional acrobats
Fictional electrical engineers
Fictional female engineers
Fictional marksmen and snipers
Fictional bisexual females
DC Comics LGBT superheroes
Vigilante characters in comics
DC Comics sidekicks